Shah Gozar may refer to:
 Shah Gozar, Kermanshah
 Shah Gozar, Kurdistan